In coding theory and related engineering problems, coding gain is the measure in the difference between the signal-to-noise ratio (SNR) levels between the uncoded system and coded system required to reach the same bit error rate (BER) levels when used with the error correcting code (ECC).

Example
If the uncoded BPSK system in AWGN environment has a bit error rate (BER) of 10−2 at the SNR level 4 dB, and the corresponding coded (e.g., BCH) system has the same BER at an SNR of 2.5 dB, then we say the coding gain = , due to the code used (in this case BCH).

Power-limited regime
The nominal coding gain  is defined as

 

This definition is normalized so that  for 2-PAM or (2×2)-QAM. If the average number of nearest neighbors per transmitted bit  is equal to one, the effective coding gain  is approximately equal to the nominal coding gain . However, if , the effective coding gain  is less than the nominal coding gain  by an amount which depends on the steepness of the  vs.  curve at the target . This curve can be plotted using the union bound estimate (UBE)

 

where Q is the Gaussian probability-of-error function.

Example

Bandwidth-limited regime
The nominal coding gain  is defined as

 

This definition is normalized so that  for M-PAM or (M×M)-QAM. The UBE becomes

 

where  is the average number of nearest neighbors per two dimensions.

See also
Channel capacity
Eb/N0

References
MIT OpenCourseWare, 6.451 Principles of Digital Communication II, Lecture Notes sections 5.3, 5.5, 6.3, 6.4

Coding theory
Error detection and correction